There is one regular compound of cubes:
Compound of five cubes

There are 3 uniform compounds of cubes:
Compound of six cubes with rotational freedom, UC7 
Compound of three cubes, UC8

There is one uniform dual:
Compound of two cubes

There is one infinite family:
Prismatic compound of prisms

Polyhedral compounds